The 2012–13 Scottish Premier League was the fifteenth and final season of the Scottish Premier League, the highest division of Scottish football, since its inception in 1998. The season began on 4 August 2012 and ended on 19 May 2013.

Twelve teams contested the league. Ross County (champions) and Dundee (runners-up) were promoted from the 2011–12 First Division, replacing Dunfermline (relegated) and Rangers (entered administration and demoted). After the SPL clubs voted against Rangers continuing in the league, the club were accepted into the fourth tier of Scottish football, with Dundee taking their place in the SPL.

On 21 April, Celtic retained their title after a 4–1 home win against Inverness Caledonian Thistle at Celtic Park.

This was the final season of the Scottish Premier League before it was abolished in June 2013, when the SPL and SFL merged to form the new Scottish Professional Football League, with its top division being known as the Scottish Premiership.

Teams

Dunfermline were relegated from the 2011–12 Scottish Premier League. Ross County, who won the 2011–12 Scottish First Division, were promoted. The 2012–13 season marks the top-flight debut for the Highland team.

After  failing to exit administration by an agreed CVA, Rangers was replaced with the term "Club 12" when the fixture list was published on 18 June 2012. The transfer of the club's membership share of the SPL to the new company that had bought Rangers was dependent on a vote by the remaining SPL clubs. Eight clubs publicly declared that they would oppose the membership transfer, which would mean that they could not play in the SPL. The vote took place on 4 July 2012, and Rangers were refused re-entry to the SPL by a 10-1 majority. Dundee, who had finished second in the 2011–12 Scottish First Division, were invited to replace Rangers.

Stadia and locations

Personnel and kits

Note: Flags indicate national team as has been defined under FIFA eligibility rules. Players may hold more than one non-FIFA nationality.

Managerial changes

League table

Results

Matches 1–22
Teams play each other twice, once at home, once away

Matches 23–33
Teams play every other team once (either at home or away)

Matches 34–38
After 33 matches, the league splits into two sections of six teams each, with teams playing every other team in their section once (either at home or away). The exact matches are determined upon the league table at the time of the split.

Top six

Bottom six

Season statistics

Top scorers

Assists

Hat-tricks

Scoring
First goal of the season: Kris Commons for Celtic against Aberdeen (4 August 2012)
Fastest goal of the season:  12 seconds, Kris Commons for Celtic against Aberdeen (16 March 2013)
Latest goal of the season: 94 minutes, Georgios Samaras for Celtic against Aberdeen (16 March 2013)
Largest winning margin: 5 goals
St Mirren 0–5 Celtic (20 October 2012)
Celtic 5–0 Dundee (24 February 2013)
Highest scoring game: 9 goals
St Mirren 5–4 Ross County (29 September 2012)
Most goals scored in a match by a single team: 6 goals
Celtic 6–2 Dundee United (16 February 2013)
Most goals scored in a match by a losing team: 4 goals
St Mirren 5–4 Ross County (29 September 2012)

Clean sheets
Most clean sheets: 16
Celtic
Fewest clean sheets: 5
Dundee

Discipline
Most yellow cards (club): 76
Ross County
Most yellow cards (player): 11
Iain Davidson (Dundee)
James Fowler (Kilmarnock)
Jim Goodwin (St Mirren)
Most red cards (club): 6
Dundee
Motherwell
St Johnstone
Most red cards (player): 2
Jim Goodwin (St Mirren)
Owain Tudur Jones (Inverness CT)
Rowan Vine (St Johnstone)

Awards

Monthly awards

See also
Nine in a row

References

External links
 

2012-13
1
Scot